Eresia lansdorfi, the false erato or Lansdorf's crescent, is a butterfly of the family Nymphalidae.

Description
The upperside of the wings is black. The forewings have a yellowish basal stripe, while the postdiscal area is light red brown, including the costal bar. The hindwings have a pale yellow transverse band.

This medium-sized species imitates (Batesian mimicry) two local subspecies of Heliconius erato (hence the common name) and Heliconius melpomene.

Larvae feed on Ruellia brevifolia.

Distribution
This species can be found in Brazil, Northern Argentina, Paraguay, Uruguay and Peru.

References

Melitaeini
Butterflies described in 1819
Nymphalidae of South America
Taxa named by Jean-Baptiste Godart